The Crowle Stone is the remains of an Anglo-Saxon cross at the back of the Church of England parish church of St Oswald at Crowle, Lincolnshire.

This was originally carved as a cross shaft and until 1919 it was used as a lintel over the west door.  The preservation of the stone is almost certainly as a result of the Norman masons reusing it when the church was built in 1150.

The stone is ornately carved on all three sides. At the bottom of one face there is a runic inscription which would date the cross shaft as being before 950 as the use of runes had almost completely died out by then.

References

 

Anglo-Saxon archaeology
Archaeological sites in Lincolnshire
High crosses in England
History of Lincolnshire
Monuments and memorials in Lincolnshire
Monumental crosses in England